Elisabeth Mulder Pierluisi (married name, Elizabeth Mulder de Dauner; Barcelona, 9 February 1904 – Barcelona, 28 November 1987) was a Spanish writer, poet, translator, journalist and literary critic. Her father, Enrique Mulder García (Marquis of Tedema Toelosdorp of the Netherlands) was a Dutch-Spaniard doctor; her mother was Zoraida Pierluigi Grau, a Puerto Rican with Italian and Catalonian ancestry. Though she inherited the Marquise of Tedema Toelosdorp title, she never used it. The poet, journalist, and athlete, Ana María Martínez Sagi, considered Mulder to be her great love, but family kept them separated.

Selected works

See also
 List of Costa Brava films

References

 María del Mar Mañas Martínez, "Elisabeth Mulder: una escritora en la encrucijada entre el Modernismo y la Modernidad", en Arbor: Ciencia, pensamiento y cultura, núm. 719, 2006, págs. 385-396.

External links

1904 births
1987 deaths
Writers from Barcelona
Women writers from Catalonia
Poets from Catalonia
Translators from Catalonia
Journalists from Catalonia
Literary critics from Catalonia
Spanish women poets
Spanish romantic fiction writers
Spanish dramatists and playwrights
Spanish women journalists
Spanish women literary critics
English–Spanish translators
French–Spanish translators
20th-century Spanish women writers
20th-century Spanish novelists
20th-century Spanish poets
20th-century translators
Lesbian writers
20th-century Spanish LGBT people
Spanish LGBT writers